The two-stage 2012 MLS Re-Entry Draft took place on December 7, 2012 (Stage 1) and December 14, 2012 (Stage 2). All 19 Major League Soccer clubs were eligible to participate.

The Stage 1 and Stage 2 Drafts were conducted in the same order as the traditional Waiver Draft, with clubs choosing in reverse order of their 2012 Major League Soccer season finish.

Teams selected players who fell under the following circumstances:

 Players who were at least 23 years old, had a minimum of three years of MLS experience, and whose options were not exercised by their club (available at option salary for 2013).
 Players who were at least 25 years old, had a minimum of four years of MLS experience, were out of contract, and whose club did not offer them a contract at their previous salary (available at 2012 salary).
 Players who were at least 30 years old, had a minimum of eight years of MLS experience, were out of contract, and whose club did not wish to re-sign them (available for at least 105 percent of their 2012 salary).

Players who were not selected in the Stage 1 draft were made available for the Stage 2 draft. Clubs that selected players in Stage 2 must negotiate a new salary with any player not under contract.

Teams also have the option of passing on their selection.

Available players
Players were required to meet age and service requirements to participate as stipulated by the terms of the MLS Collective Bargaining Agreement. Teams had to submit a list of available players to the league by December 3, 2012. The league released a list of all players available for the draft on December 5, 2012. The league released an updated list of players available for Stage 2 of the draft on December 14, 2012.

Stage One
The first stage of the 2012 MLS Re-Entry Draft took place at 3pm on December 7, 2012. All 19 Major League Soccer clubs participated.

Round 1

Round 2

Stage Two
The second stage of the 2012 MLS Re-Entry Draft took place on December 14, 2012. All 19 Major League Soccer clubs were eligible to participate but New York Red Bulls never joined the conference call.

Round 1

Round 1 trades

Round 2

Round 3

Round 4

After all clubs had passed on the remaining players, clubs were then allowed to draft their own former players. All clubs passed on this option.

References 

Major League Soccer drafts
Mls Re-entry Draft, 2012
MLS Re-Entry Draft